Achirana is an album by Greek composer and pianist Vassilis Tsabropoulos with bassist Arild Andersen and drummer John Marshall recorded in 1999 and released on the ECM label.

Reception
The Allmusic review by Thom Jurek awarded the album 4 stars stating "As Tsabropoulos' debut, this is without doubt an auspicious beginning".

Track listing
All compositions by Vassilis Tsabropoulos except as indicated
 "Achirana" (Arild Andersen, John Marshall, Vassilis Tsabropoulos) - 8:06 
 "Diamond Cut Diamond" (Andersen, Marshall, Tsabropoulos) - 7:25 
 "Valley" (Andersen, Tsabropoulos) - 5:42 
 "Mystic" - 7:21 
 "The Spell" - 10:40 
 "She's Gone" (Andersen) - 5:48 
 "Fable" - 8:22 
 "Song for Phyllis" - 7:52 
 "Monologue" - 8:23

Personnel
Vassilis Tsabropoulos - piano
Arild Andersen - double bass
John Marshall - drums

References

2000 albums
ECM Records albums
Vassilis Tsabropoulos albums
Albums produced by Manfred Eicher